Richard Trunk (born Tauberbischofsheim, 10 February 1879 - died Herrsching, 2 June 1968) was a German composer, pianist, conductor, and critic.

Life 
He studied in Frankfurt with Iwan Knorr before traveling to Munich for further studies with Josef Rheinberger. He accompanied numerous singers (including Eugen Gura), taught singing for a time, and served as music critic for the Münchener Post from 1907. He was invited to New York City and Newark, New Jersey to conduct the Arion Society in 1912; he returned home with the outbreak of World War I. He later became music critic for the Bayrische Staatszeitung, and taught singing in Cologne from 1920 until 1934.  In 1925 he married the singer Maria Delbran.  In 1934 he returned to Munich as the president of the Akademie der Tonkunst. He retired to the Ammersee after World War II.

Trunk was an early member of the Nazi Party. His songs Op. 65 set to music texts by Baldur von Schirach and Hanns Johst.

Works
Most of Trunk's musical works were choral pieces or songs with piano accompaniment, though he also composed an operetta (Herzdame, 1916) and some instrumental works and chamber music.

External links

References
"Richard Trunk". In David Mason Greene, Biographical Dictionary of Composers.  Garden City, New York; Doubleday & Company, Inc., 1985.

1879 births
1968 deaths
German composers
German music critics
German music educators
German conductors (music)
German male conductors (music)
German male non-fiction writers